Puente Juan Bosch is a relatively new bridge crossing the Ozama River in the city of Santo Domingo, Dominican Republic. It is named after former president Juan Bosch.

References

Bridges in the Dominican Republic
Buildings and structures in Santo Domingo